Your Studio and You is a 1995 American comedy short film created by Matt Stone and Trey Parker for Universal Pictures and commissioned by comedic filmmaker David Zucker. It was to be played at a party Seagram threw for its employees acquired as a result of its Universal take-over. It parodies the style of 1950s educational films such as Duck and Cover, while poking fun at Universal and its talent. It was shot in the Universal Studios Lot, and it runs approximately 14 minutes.

Upon commissioning the duo to make this film, David Zucker
failed to mention that there was no script, so everything was written by Parker and Stone less than an hour before it was shot.

The film is notable in that it was Stone and Parker's first Hollywood gig. Parker has said that "you could probably make a feature film out of the experience of making that movie because it was just two dudes from college suddenly directing Steven Spielberg." This film has still seen no public release as it was intended to be strictly an internal film (indeed, its creators were not even allowed a copy), but copies of the film have surfaced on the Internet. Ifilm.com had the video on its site for a limited time. The video was promoted on the site in ad banners. These advertisements included the date that ifilm.com would stop hosting the video.

Stone and Parker would make their first major studio-produced feature, BASEketball, for Universal with David Zucker directing (albeit one in which they merely starred). Parker would very later appear in the 2017 animated Universal/Illumination film Despicable Me 3 as the antagonist Balthazar Bratt.

Celebrity appearances 
The film is also notable for its use of a number of celebrity actors, musicians, writers, producers, and directors in the Universal family, including Andrew Bergman, James Cameron (shown improving the Universal Studios landscaping), Shaun Cassidy, Robin Cook, Shelley Fabares, Michael J. Fox, Brian Grazer, Heavy D, Jeffrey Katzenberg, Barry Kemp, Angela Lansbury (shown painting the Psycho House),  Mike Lobell, Traci Lords, Kevin Misher, Demi Moore, Darrin Pfeiffer, John Singleton, Steven Spielberg (shown as a Universal Studios Guide), Sylvester Stallone (in his Rocky Balboa character, and subtitled for comedic effect), Marty Stuart, David Zucker, and Jerry Zucker.

Matt Stone appears with Trey Parker as two guys at a food stand during the "It's UCS for me!" segment.

Recurring themes 
Recurring themes/elements in the film include:
Shots of the Jaws "shark attack" attraction on the Universal Studios Backlot Tour accompanied by the narrated phrase, "old and stupid."
Seagrams wine coolers (usually distributed as a gift in order to appease a celebrity)
The placement of porcelain deer in order to beautify a location (usually at the behest of the narrator)
Buttons (sometimes comically oversized) that parody 50s campaign buttons, reading "I like Universal," and "Universal is A-OK!"
As he drinks milk and eats Oreos, Michael J. Fox asks "Say, what does that mean?" repeatedly throughout the film. This is a direct parody of 1950s educational films, which stereotypically include such characters.
The narrator repeatedly pronounces modernize as "modrenized".
The overuse of the word "say" by various characters
The appearance of Stallone, speaking as Rocky Balboa, with subtitles in the bottom of the screen.

References

External links 

'South Park' Creator Trey Parker Cops to Kooky Universal Spoof 

1995 films
1995 comedy films
Universal Pictures short films
Works by Trey Parker and Matt Stone
Seagram
Cultural depictions of actors
Cultural depictions of film directors
American comedy short films
1990s English-language films
1990s American films